Franklyn "Frank" Schaefer (born December 7, 1961) is a German-American author and an LGBTQ advocate.  He is an ordained minister in the United Methodist Church.

Schaefer established a popular Internet site for the support of Christian educators and ministers, a forum for the discussion and exchange of resources, called Desperate Preacher's Site, in 1996.

Defrocking
In 2013, he was tried by a United Methodist court for officiating at his son's same-sex marriage. He was defrocked on December 19, 2013, when he refused to uphold the Book of Discipline in its entirety, which would have meant to denounce same-sex marriage rights.

Speaking engagements and activism
Following his defrocking, Schaefer became a speaker and activist. Although he was reinstated by the Northeastern Jurisdictional Committee on Appeals on June 26, 2014 (which was upheld by the Judicial Council on October 25, 2014), he continues to advocate for human rights while also working in a new United Methodist parish in Isla Vista, California.

Publications

Bibliography
 Franklyn Schaefer: Defrocked: How A Father's Act of Love Shook the United Methodist Church, Autobiography, paperback (with Sherri Wood Emmons), Chalice Press, 2014.

Filmography

Schaefer has been interviewed on the TV shows Good Morning America, The View, Hardball with Chris Matthews, Anderson Cooper 360°, The Last Word with Lawrence O'Donnell, and TakePart Live, and for the documentary An Act of Love.

Discography
 Franklyn Schaefer: Guitar Reflections: Then & Now, audio CD (instrumental, folk) JavaCasa Music, 2013.
 Franklyn Schaefer: Love Like An Ocean, audio CD (Contemporary Christian) JavaCasa Music, 2011.
 Franklyn Schaefer: Keep On Smiling, audio CD (Contemporary Country) JavaCasa Music, 2008.

References

External links
official website
blog by Rev. Frank Schaefer
United Methodist Website "Coverage Summary: Frank Schaefer Case"
Reconciling Ministries Network Blog "Rev. Frank Schaefer - Facts and Media Coverage" 
"Defrocked" by Franklyn Schaefer on Amazon.com

American LGBT rights activists
Living people
Methodist ministers
American male writers
People from Isla Vista, California
1961 births